Francis William Doyle Jones, sometimes Francis William Doyle-Jones, (11 November 1873–10 June 1938) was a British sculptor. Although principally a portrait sculptor, Jones is notable for the number of war memorials he created for British towns and cities following both the Boer War and World War I.

Biography
Jones was born, to Irish parents, in Hartlepool. He was the eldest son of a stonemason and monumental sculptor, Francis Jones (c. 1846–1918), from County Monaghan and for a time worked for his father before studying in Paris. Jones returned to England to study at the National Art Training School in London, where he was taught by Édouard Lantéri. After graduating, Jones established a studio at Chelsea in west London and had his first sculpture shown at the Royal Academy in 1903. Between then and 1936, Jones had about thirty works, including portraits and statuettes, exhibited at the Academy. Throughout the 1910s, he also regularly exhibited with the International Society of Sculptors, Painters and Gravers and at the annual exhibition of Works by Artists from the Northern Counties held at the Laing Art Gallery in Newcastle upon Tyne.

From 1904 to 1906 Jones created a series of Boer War memorials for British towns. For the memorials at Penrith and Gateshead he created identical memorials featuring a female figure representing Peace crowning the Heroes. Following the end of World War I Jones won several commissions for further public war memorials. He created several designs, including cenotaphs, for these works but in some instances, such as for the memorials at Woking, Gravesend and Brighouse he used a common design with a figure of Victory standing on a globe and holding a wreath of laurel leaves.

Jones had a keen appreciation of Irish culture and, from early in his career, received several public commissions from Irish organisations, most notably for a monumental statue of Saint Patrick at Saul, County Down. From 1923 onwards, he was a regular exhibitor with the Royal Hibernian Academy, RHA, in Dublin. Shown at the RHA in 1923, Jones' bust of Michael Collins was acquired by the National Gallery of Ireland in 1924 while the Hugh Lane Gallery in Dublin holds a bronze bust of Joseph Devlin by Jones.

Jones was elected an associate member of the Royal Society of British Sculptors in 1923.

Public works

1900–1909

1910–1919

1920–1929

1930 and later

Other works
 At the Royal Academy in 1909, Jones exhibited the silver relief sculpture White Horses, which was inspired by a Rudyard Kipling poem and was designed for Harley Hall near Northallerton.
 The offering of youth on the altar of patriotism, a relief shown at the Royal Hibernian Academy in 1925.

References

External links

 

1873 births
1938 deaths
20th-century English sculptors
20th-century English male artists
Alumni of the Royal Academy Schools
English male sculptors
People from Hartlepool